Kurt Renner was a German general (Generalleutnant) in the Wehrmacht during World War II who commanded the 211th Infantry Division and the 174th Reserve Division. He was killed whilst in command of the 174th Reserve Division on 26 August 1943 by Polish underground forces.

Notes and references
Notes

Bibliography

 

1886 births
People from Plauen
People from the Kingdom of Saxony
German Army personnel of World War I
Military personnel from Saxony
Recipients of the clasp to the Iron Cross, 1st class
1943 deaths
German Army personnel killed in World War II
People executed by the Polish Underground State
German Army generals of World War II